Tarquin Hall is an English writer and journalist. He was born in London, in 1969, to an English father and American mother. Hall has spent much of his adult life away from England, living in the United States, Pakistan, India, Kenya and Turkey, and travelling extensively in Africa, the Middle East, and South Asia.

News reporter
Hall has worked in TV news and is a former South Asia bureau chief of Associated Press TV, based in New Delhi. His chosen subject matter has been wide ranging. He has written features on Wilfred Thesiger, Texan rattlesnake hunters, the Taliban, and British-Asian Urdu poets. Hall's exclusive reports include a profile on Emma McCune, an English woman who married Southern Sudanese guerrilla commander Riek Machar; the draining of Iraq's marshes by Saddam Hussein; and a one-on-one with Abdullah Öcalan, the former leader of the Kurdistan Workers' Party (PKK), in a Syrian safe house.

Novelist
He is the author of seven books and dozens of articles that have appeared in many British newspapers and magazines, including the Times, Sunday Times, Daily Telegraph, Observer and New Statesman. Hall's books have received wide acclaim in the British press, as did To the Elephant Graveyard and Salaam Brick Lane, which recounts a year spent above a Bangladeshi sweatshop on Brick Lane (in the East End of London).

In 2009, Hall published his first mystery novel The Case of the Missing Servant, introducing the fictional Punjabi character Vish Puri, India's Most Private Investigator. The second in the series, The Case of the Man Who Died Laughing, was released in June 2010. The third, The Case of the Deadly Butter Chicken, was released in July 2012. The fourth title, The Case of the Love Commandos, released in October 2013, features the real-life Love Commandos, a volunteer team of Indians who try to ease the way for marriages between Hindus of different classes. Meanwhile, Hall has self-published The Delhi Detectives Handbook, which chronicles Vish Puri's world and is written in the detective's humble-bragging voice.

Executive roles
Hall currently holds the office of Chief Executive Officer (CEO) of the educational and cultural charity, The Idries Shah Foundation.

Personal life
Hall currently lives in the UK after six years residing in New Delhi. He is married to the Indian-born American BBC reporter and presenter Anu Anand. They have a young son and daughter.

Works

References

External links
Audio interview with Tarquin Hall discussing his first mystery novel - The Case of the Missing Servant

Vish Puri

Living people
1969 births
British male journalists
British writers
People educated at Sussex House School